The 1887 Kentucky gubernatorial election was held on August 1, 1887. Democratic nominee Simon Bolivar Buckner defeated Republican nominee William O'Connell Bradley with 50.70% of the vote.

General election

Candidates
Major party candidates
Simon Bolivar Buckner, Democratic
William O'Connell Bradley, Republican 

Other candidates
Fontaine T. Fox, Prohibition
A. H. Cardin, Union Labor

Results

References

1887
Kentucky
Gubernatorial
August 1887 events